David Solomon may refer to:

 David Solomon (artist) (born 1976), American artist and painter
 David Solomon (TV producer), American television director and producer
 David Solomon (writer), Australian educator, scholar and writer
 David Solomon, sperm donor for the Suleman octuplets
 David Solomon, researcher and creator of the Solomon curve
 Dave Solomon (rugby) (1913–1997), New Zealand rugby union and rugby league footballer
 Dave Solomon (journalist) (1952–2011), Connecticut sportswriter and newspaper columnist
 David Henry Solomon (born 1929), Australian polymer chemist
 David M. Solomon (born c. 1962), American investment banker and DJ/producer

See also
David Salomon (disambiguation)
David Solomons (disambiguation)